Museum St. Ingbert is a former art museum in St. Ingbert, Saarland, Germany.

External links
www.st-ingbert.de

Museums in Saarland
Art museums and galleries in Germany
Sankt Ingbert